Saint Vincent and the Grenadines – United States relations are bilateral relations between Saint Vincent and the Grenadines and the United States.

The United States and St. Vincent have solid bilateral relations. Both governments are concerned with eradicating local marijuana cultivation and combating the illegal drug trade. In 1995, the United States and St. Vincent signed a maritime law enforcement agreement. In 1996, the Government of St. Vincent and the Grenadines signed an extradition treaty with the United States. In 1997, the two countries signed a mutual legal assistance treaty.

The United States supports the Government of St. Vincent and the Grenadines' efforts to expand its economic base and to provide a higher standard of living for its citizens. U.S. assistance is channeled primarily through multilateral agencies such as the World Bank. The United States has 10 Peace Corps volunteers in St. Vincent and the Grenadines, working in primary literacy education. The U.S. military also provides assistance through construction and humanitarian civic action projects.

A relatively small number of Americans—fewer than 1,000—reside on the islands.

Principal U.S. Embassy Officials include:
 United States Ambassador—Linda S. Taglialatela
 Deputy Chief of Mission—O.P. Garza
 Political/Economic Counselor—Ian Campbell
 Consul General—Clyde Howard Jr.
 Regional Labor Attaché—Jake Aller
 Commercial Affairs—Jake Aller
 Public Affairs Officer—John Roberts
 Peace Corps Director—Kate Raftery

Embassies
The United States maintains no official presence in St. Vincent, with the exception of the Peace Corps office. The Ambassador and Embassy officers are resident in Barbados and frequently travel to St. Vincent.

See also
North American Union
North American Free Trade Agreement
Free Trade Area of the Americas
Third Border Initiative
Caribbean Community
Caribbean Basin Initiative (CBI)
Caribbean Basin Trade Partnership Act
Western Hemisphere Travel Initiative
 Foreign relations of Saint Vincent and the Grenadines
 Foreign relations of the United States

References

External links
History of Saint Vincent and the Grenadines - U.S. relations
The United States Department of State - Saint Vincent and the Grenadines

 
Bilateral relations of the United States